Perittia piperatella is a moth of the family Elachistidae. It is found on the Iberian Peninsula.

The wingspan is 8.5–10 mm.

The larvae feed on Cistus ladanifer. They mine the leaves of their host plant. The mine has the form of a large, strongly puckered, tentiform mine at the leaf margin and usually at the leaf tip. Pupation takes place inside the mine, but not in a cocoon. Larvae can be found from November to March.

References

Moths described in 1859
Elachistidae
Moths of Europe